The following is a list of Colorado Buffaloes men's basketball head coaches. There have been 18 head coaches of the Buffaloes in their 119-season history.

Colordao's current head coach is Tad Boyle. He was hired as the Buffaloes' head coach in April 2010, replacing Jeff Bzdelik, who left to become the head coach at Wake Forest.

References

Colorado

Colorado Buffaloes men's basketball coaches